Franciszek Bujak (25 November 1896 – 11 September 1975) was a Polish cross-country skier. He competed in the men's 18 kilometre event at the 1924 Winter Olympics.

References

1896 births
1975 deaths
Polish male cross-country skiers
Polish male Nordic combined skiers
Olympic cross-country skiers of Poland
Olympic Nordic combined skiers of Poland
Cross-country skiers at the 1924 Winter Olympics
Nordic combined skiers at the 1924 Winter Olympics
People from Wadowice County
20th-century Polish people